The Ruf BTR2 is a sports car produced by Ruf Automobile. Based on the Porsche 993 Carrera, it succeeded the original BTR.

History 

The BTR2 began production in 1993, as a homage to the company's first production car, shortly after the Porsche 911 (993) started production. It preceded the introduction of the 993 generation of the 911 Turbo by 2 years, making it the first turbocharged 993 model ever produced. The BTR2, based on the 911 Carrera, was only available with rear wheel drive, and featured a single turbo setup and narrow bodywork, while the 993 Turbo had an all wheel drive system, twin sequential turbochargers and wide bodywork.

Specifications 

The BTR2 is powered by a 3.6 L flat-six engine based on the unit in the 993 Carrera but upgraded with a single turbocharger running 11.6 psi of boost pressure, intercooler, modified camshafts, an auxiliary oil-cooler, a new exhaust system, lowered compression ratio (from 11.3:1 to 8.4:1) and a Bosch Motronic engine management system. Other mechanical changes included a RUF 6-speed manual transmission, 30 mm lowered suspension, stiffer anti roll bars, limited-slip differential with 60 percent lockup and bigger brakes (320 mm front and 300 mm rear). The also featured 18 inch Ruf 5-spoke alloy wheels, special bucket seats, restyled bumpers and a fixed "whale tail" rear wing reminiscent to the one found on the Porsche 964 Turbo.

References 

Sports cars
Cars introduced in 1993
Coupés
BTR2
Rear-engined vehicles
Cars powered by boxer engines